NGC 3794, also cataloged in the New General Catalogue as NGC 3804, is a low-surface-brightness galaxy in the constellation Ursa Major. It was discovered on April 14, 1789 by the astronomer William Herschel.

References

External links 
 

Intermediate spiral galaxies
Ursa Major (constellation)
Low surface brightness galaxies
3794
036238